This article lists the main sport climbing competitions and their results for 2018.

World Cup

World Championships

Continental Championships

Others

References

External links
 International Federation of Sport Climbing Website (IFSC)

 
Sport climbing
2018 in sports
2018 sport-related lists